North Carolina Highway 11 (NC 11) is a primary state highway in the U.S. state of North Carolina. Traveling  in a north–south alignment through Eastern North Carolina, it connects the towns and cities of Wallace, Kenansville, Kinston, Greenville and Murfreesboro.

Route description
NC 11 begins at US 74/US 76 in the unincorporated community of Freeman. It travels north to NC 87 at Sandyfield before exiting Columbus County. Traveling in a northeasterly direction, NC 11/NC 53 turns east at Atkinson; at Wards Corner it changes its concurrency from NC 53, which continues to Burgaw, to US 421 towards Clinton. Traveling northeast, it crosses over Rock Fish Creek into Duplin County.

NC 11 splits towards the Tin City area of Wallace, while US 117 continues towards the downtown area. Northeast of Wallace, NC 11 connects with I-40 (exit 385) and continues through Murphey, Greenevers and Register before reaching the NC 24/NC 903 Kenansville Bypass (which can be used as a bypass for through traffic along NC 11). Continuing through Kenansville, it joins briefly with NC 50; north of town, it joins with NC 903 and continues northeast to Kornegay, where it switches concurrency with NC 111 for  before continuing east into Lenoir County. At Pink Hill, NC 11 continues northeasterly and widens to a four-lane divided highway as it travels through Deep Run and Albrittons and Jacksons Crossroads, where it is joined by NC 55. At an area known as Skinner's By-Pass, NC 11/NC 55 enter Kinston's city limits and connects with US 70/US 258. Crossing east over the Neuse River and into downtown Kinston, NC 11/NC 55 connect with US 70 Bus./US 258 Bus. along Queen Street. At a roundabout, NC 11/NC 55 returns to a northeasterly direction and through the Harverytown area of Kinston. Upon leaving Kinston's city limits, NC 55 splits and continues towards New Bern. Parallel to the CSX rail line, since Graingers, NC 11 connects with NC 118, which connects to nearby Grifton, before crossing the Contentnea Creek and into Pitt County. In Pitt County, NC 11 is directed onto both its newer bypass route which is a rural controlled access highway bypassing most of Greenville, and its suburbs Ayden, Winterville, and other small communities. It also gives drivers on NC 11 access to I-587 and US 264. And its mainline route, which on the other hand, is a rural partial controlled access highway bypassing the same surrounding towns, but it instead also serves as an arterial thoroughfare going through central Greenville.

With the exception of a stretch between Kinston and Greenville, most of NC 11 is largely a disused rural route. All other major sections are cosigned with more major U.S. Highways, including a stretch of US 421 near the southern terminus and US 13 north of Greenville. As a through route, US 258 or US 13 travel along the same general directions, but appear to be better maintained and closer to major population centers. The central segment is mostly four lanes and divided, although not controlled access.

History
NC 11 was established in 1921 as an original state highway, traveling northeasterly from NC 40, in Kenansville, to NC 10, in Kinston; then continuing north, through Greenville, to NC 90, in Bethel. Around 1930, NC 11 was extended north on new primary routing to NC 125, in Oak City, via Hassell. In 1940, NC 11 was extended south from Kenansville to Tin City, replacing part of US 117; then with a short concurrency with US 117, it travels  to the North Carolina Coastal Experimental Station (agriculture testing facility), replacing NC 401. In 1942, NC 11 was rerouted to a more direct route between Bethel and Oak City; its old alignment through Hassell was downgraded to secondary roads (today NC 42 and Hassell Road).

By 1942, the first rerouting of NC 11 through Kinston took place; the original alignment was crossing over the Neuse River via Caswell Street, north on Queen Street, east on Vernon Avenue and northeast on Minerva Street. The realignment begins in Jacksons Store with concurrency with NC 55 going east along Tyree Road to US 258, from there continuing north into Kinston along Queen Street; the old alignment along Caswell Street is downgraded to secondary road. By 1948, NC 11/NC 55 was rerouted east onto King Street, north on East Street, east on Washington Avenue and then northeast on Minerva Street; the old alignment through central Kinston became NC 11A. In 1952, NC 11/NC 55 was rerouted onto its current routing from Jacksons Store north into Kinston, crossing the Neuse River on King Street; Tyree Road (SR 1341) was downgraded to secondary road while US 258 remained.

By 1958, NC 11 was rerouted to its current alignment in Greenville along Memorial Drive; its old alignment along Dickinson Avenue to Greene Street was downgraded to secondary roads. By 1963, the spur to the North Carolina Coastal Experimental Station was downgraded to secondary road and NC 11 was truncated at US 117 near Wallace. In 1966, NC 11 was extended north on new primary routing, across the Roanoke River, to NC 308, in Lewiston. In 1967, its northern terminus was extended again to NC 305, in Connaritsa. In 1969, NC 11/NC 55 was rerouted to its current alignment along Tiffany Street (today Dr. Martin Luther King Jr. Boulevard), with its old alignment along East Street and Washington Avenue downgraded to secondary roads. Near Grifton, NC 11 was placed on new western bypass, leaving behind Highland Boulevard/Avenue.

North Carolina Highway 401

North Carolina Highway 401 (NC 401) was established as a new primary spur of NC 40 to the North Carolina Coastal Plains Experiment Station (agriculture testing facility), south of Wallace. In 1940, NC 401 was replaced by an extension of NC 11, which was eventually downgraded to secondary road by 1963 (today Jonestown Road).

Major intersections

Special routes

Kenansville alternate spur

North Carolina Highway 11 Alternate (NC 11A) was a renumbering of part of US 117. It existed as a cutoff between NC 11 and NC 24. It was decommissioned by 1960, downgraded to Tyndall Street (SR 1383).

Kinston alternate route

North Carolina Highway 11 Alternate (NC 11A) was a renumbering of NC 11 through downtown Kinston, via Queen Street and Vernon Avenue. In 1960, it was renumbered to NC 11 Business.

Kinston business loop

North Carolina Highway 11 Business (NC 11 Bus) was a renumbering of NC 11A through downtown Kinston, via Queen Street and Vernon Avenue. In 1969, the route was downgraded to secondary roads.

Greenville bypass

North Carolina Highway 11 Bypass (NC 11 Byp.), was established in 2019 as a bypass route of NC 11. Unlike the previous bypass projects where NC 11 would be rerouted onto a newly constructed bypass with the section going through the towns being designated as a business route, NC 11 actually bypasses Ayden and Winterville, but goes through Greenville. While the bypass route also bypasses Greenville. The bypass connects its parent route south of Ayden to the routes US 264, US 13, U.S. 264 Alt,  and Interstate 587 in Greenville. The northern 5.3 section of the bypass overlaps with US 264 and was originally constructed for said route to also bypass Greenville. The southern  section of the route is known as the Greenville Southwest Bypass which was completed the same year the route was established.

Bethel business loop

North Carolina Highway 11 Business (NC 11 Bus) was established in 2003 as a renumbering of mainline NC 11 through downtown Bethel, via Main Street. It shares a complete concurrency with US 13 Bus.

Aulander business loop

North Carolina Highway 11 Business (NC 11 Bus) was established in 1978 as a renumbering of mainline NC 11 through downtown Aulander, via Main Street.

See also
North Carolina Bicycle Route 5 – NC 11 concurrent in Long View

References

External links

NCRoads.com: N.C. 11
NCRoads.com: N.C. 11-A
NCRoads.com: N.C. 11 Business

011
Transportation in Columbus County, North Carolina
Transportation in Bladen County, North Carolina
Transportation in Pender County, North Carolina
Transportation in Duplin County, North Carolina
Transportation in Lenoir County, North Carolina
Transportation in Pitt County, North Carolina
Transportation in Edgecombe County, North Carolina
Transportation in Martin County, North Carolina
Transportation in Bertie County, North Carolina
Transportation in Hertford County, North Carolina
Historic Albemarle Tour